Stojna Vangelovska (born 5 February 1964) is a Macedonian and former Yugoslav female professional basketball player.

References

1964 births
Living people
Sportspeople from Skopje
Macedonian women's basketball players
Yugoslav women's basketball players
Shooting guards
ŽKK Partizan players
Panathinaikos WBC players
Olympic basketball players of Yugoslavia
Basketball players at the 1984 Summer Olympics
Basketball players at the 1988 Summer Olympics
Olympic silver medalists for Yugoslavia
Olympic medalists in basketball
Universiade medalists in basketball
Universiade gold medalists for Yugoslavia
Universiade bronze medalists for Yugoslavia
Medalists at the 1988 Summer Olympics
Medalists at the 1983 Summer Universiade
Medalists at the 1987 Summer Universiade